Lyrognathus fuscus is a theraphosid spider species in the genus Lyrognathus, found in Borneo. The scientific name for the species was first published in 2010 by West and Nunn.

References 

Theraphosidae
Spiders of Asia
Spiders described in 2010
Taxa named by Rick C. West